Scott Dennis Menzel born November 9, 1982, is an American film critic. Menzel currently serves as the Editor-in-Chief of the entertainment website We Live Entertainment which he founded in 2011. Prior to We Live Entertainment, Menzel reviewed films under the pseudonym MovieManMenzel for outlets such as Joblo.com and IMDb while also managing his own website MovieManMenzel.com which is now defunct. 

In 2017, Menzel co-founded the Hollywood Critics Association alongside Scott Mantz and Ashley Menzel where he currently serves as the chairman.
The association's stated purpose is to be a critics' group that is diverse and supports underrepresented voices. They are the first critics' group to separate directing honors by gender.

Menzel graduated with a B.A. degree in Mass Media Communications from Rowan University in Glassboro, New Jersey, and has a Masters in Electronic Media from Kutztown University of Pennsylvania. Menzel was the host of Popcorn Talk's Film Critics Weekly on the defunct Popcorn Talk Network.

In August 2022, Menzel and the HCA were the subjects of an article in The Hollywood Reporter after numerous members resigned, including the group's President, amid a social conflict that occurred with a member. In the THR article, Menzel also volunteered that he earned $60K “doing Whole Foods deliveries on the side.”

References

External links
 website
 

1982 births
Living people
American film critics
American reporters and correspondents